Spurlock is a surname. Notable people with the surname include:
 Isabella Smiley Davis Spurlock (1843–1906), American philanthropist.
 Jeanne Spurlock (1921–1999), American psychiatrist, professor and author
 J. David Spurlock, founder of Vanguard Productions
 Micheal Spurlock, NFL wide receiver for the Jacksonville Jaguars
 Morgan Spurlock, filmmaker
 Toofer Spurlock, fictional writer in 30 Rock
 William R. and Clarice V. Spurlock, namesakes of the Spurlock Museum